Lessa may refer to:

 Lessa (area),  a unit of measurement formerly used in the state of Manipur in India
 Lessa (Argolis), a town of ancient Argolis, Greece
 Lessa (Dragonrider), a fictional character in Anne McCaffrey's Dragonriders of Pern series
 Lessa (surname)

See also
Lessa Habayeb, a 2006 album by Moustafa Amar